John Dodson may refer to:
 John Dodson (fighter) (born 1984), American professional mixed martial arts fighter
 John Dodson (judge) (1780–1858), English judge
 John George Dodson, 1st Baron Monk Bretton (1825–1897), British Liberal politician, son of the above
 John Dillingham Dodson, proposed the Yerkes–Dodson Law relating motivation and habit
 John Dodson, 3rd Baron Monk Bretton (born 1924), agriculturist and landowner
 John Dodson, 2nd Baron Monk Bretton (1869–1933), British diplomat

See also
 John Dodson Stiles (1822–1896), U.S. Representative from Pennsylvania